New Zealand at the 2006 Commonwealth Games in Melbourne, Victoria, Australia was represented by 249 athletes competing in over 19 disciplines, with 119 officials. This was the largest team that New Zealand had ever sent to a Commonwealth Games.

New Zealand has competed in every Commonwealth Games since the first British Empire Games in 1930, and is one of only six teams to have done so. Selection is the responsibility of the New Zealand Olympic Committee. 
  
New Zealand did not perform nearly as well as expected, recording their worst performance since 1982.  They had been expected to return with forty or fifty medals, but won only 31, finishing ninth.

The flag bearer for the opening ceremony was Hamish Carter — the reigning Olympic triathlon champion. At the closing ceremony Greg Yelavich who had competed since the 1986 Games and won the most Commonwealth Games medals (11) of any New Zealander was flagbearer.

Medals

Gold
Athletics:
 Valerie Vili, Women's shot put
 Nick Willis, Men's 1500 m

Netball:
 Leana de Bruin, Belinda Colling, Vilimaina Davu, Temepara George, Laura Langman, Jessica Tuki, Anna Rowberry, Anna Scarlett, Maria Tutaia, Irene Van Dyk, Casey Williams & Adine Wilson, Women's Netball

Rugby Sevens:
 Sosene Anesi, Josh Blackie, Tamati Ellison, Nigel Hunt, Tafai Ioasa, Cory Jane, Tanerau Latimer, Liam Messam, Lote Raikabula, Amasio Valence, Alando Soakai & Onosai Tololima-Auva'a, Men's Rugby Sevens

Shooting:
 Graeme Ede, Men's Trap

Swimming:
 Moss Burmester, Men's 200 m Butterfly

Silver
Athletics:
 Tony Sargisson, Men's 50 km Walk

Badminton:
 Sara Runesten-Petersen & Daniel Shirley, Mixed Doubles

Basketball:
 Ed Book, Dillon Boucher, Pero Cameron, Casey Frank, Paul Henare, Mike Homik, Troy McLean, Aaron Olson, Tony Rampton, Lindsay Tait, Mika Vukona & Paora Winitana, Men's Basketball
 Micaela Cocks, Rebecca Cotton, Aneka Kerr, Donna Loffhagen, Angela Marino, Jessica McCormack, Kate McMeeken-Ruscoe, Lisa Pardon, Charmian Purcell, Jody Tini, Lisa Wallbutton & Nonila Wharemate, Women's Basketball

Cycling:
 Rosara Joseph, Women's Cross Country
 Hayden Roulston, Men's Points Race

Shooting:
 Juliet Etherington, Women's 50 m Rifle Prone
 Gregory Yelavich, Men's 25 m Centre Fire Pistol

Squash:
 Shelley Kitchen & Tamsyn Leevey, Women's Doubles

Swimming:
 Dean Kent, Men's 200 m Individual Medley

Triathlon:
 Bevan Docherty, Men's Individual
 Samantha Warriner, Women's Individual

Bronze
Athletics:
 Angela McKee, Women's High Jump

Cycling:
 Gordon McCauley, Men's Time Trial
 Hayden Godfrey, Tim Gudsell, Peter Latham, & Marc Ryan, Men's Team Pursuit

Lawn Bowls:
 Jan Khan & Marina Khan, Women's Pairs

Shooting:
 Juliet Etherington & Kathryn Mead, Women's 50 m Prone Rifle Pair
 Teresa Borrell, Nadine Stanton, Women's Double Trap (Pairs)

Squash:
 Shelley Kitchen, Women's Singles

Swimming:
 Moss Burmester, Men's 100 m Butterfly
 Cameron Gibson, Men's 200 m Backstroke
 Hannah McLean, Women's 200 m Backstroke
 Lauren Boyle, Alison Fitch, Melissa Ingram & Helen Norfolk, Women's 4 × 200 m Freestyle Relay

Synchronised Swimming:
 Lisa Daniels & Nina Daniels, Synchronised Swimming Duets

Triathlon:
 Andrea Hewitt, Women's Individual

Weightlifting:
 Keisha-Dean Soffe, Women's +75 kg

New Zealand's Commonwealth Games Team 2006

Aquatics

Swimming

Men

Women
{|class=wikitable style="font-size:90%"
|-align=center
!rowspan="2"|Athlete
!rowspan="2"|Events
!colspan="2"|Heat
!colspan="2"|Semifinal
!colspan="2"|Final
|- style="font-size:95%"
!Time
!Rank
!Time
!Rank
!Time
!Rank
|-align=center
|align=left|Zoë Baker
|align=left|50 m breaststroke
|31.70
|4 Q
|31.84
|5 Q
|31.45
|4
|-align=center
|align=left rowspan=2|Lauren Boyle
|align=left|100 m freestyle
|56.70
|10 Q
|56.40
|9
|colspan=2|Did not advance
|-align=center
|align=left|200 m freestyle
|2:01.11
|8 Q
|colspan=2 
|2:00.90
|8
|-align=center
|align=left rowspan=2|Annabelle Carey
|align=left|50 m breaststroke
|32.85
|10 Q
|32.71
|10
|colspan=2|Did not advance
|-align=center
|align=left|100 m breaststroke
|1:14.48
|13 Q
|1:11.99
|11
|colspan=2|Did not advance
|-align=center
|align=left rowspan=2|Nichola Chellingworth
|align=left|50 m freestyle
|26.36
|10 Q
|26.00
|5 Q
|25.89
|6
|-align=center
|align=left|50 m butterfly
|27.51
|9 Q
|27.22
|5 Q
|27.67
|7
|-align=center
|align=left rowspan=3|Elizabeth Coster
|align=left|50 m backstroke
|29.70
|5 Q
|29.29
|5 Q
|29.48
|5
|-align=center
|align=left|50 m butterfly
|27.38
|5 Q
|27.38
|11
|colspan=2|Did not advance
|-align=center
|align=left|100 m butterfly
|1:01.17
|10 Q
|1:00.34
|9
|colspan=2|Did not advance
|-align=center
|align=left rowspan=3|Alison Fitch
|align=left|50 m freestyle
|26.11
|6 Q
|26.09
|7 Q
|colspan=2|Disqualified
|-align=center
|align=left|100 m freestyle
|56.18
|6 Q
|56.06
|6 Q
|colspan=2|Did not start
|-align=center
|align=left|200 m freestyle
|2:01.69
|10
|colspan=2 
|colspan=2|Did not advance
|-align=center
|align=left rowspan=3|Melissa Ingram
|align=left|200 m freestyle
|2:02.60
|12
|colspan=2 
|colspan=2|Did not advance
|-align=center
|align=left|100 m backstroke
|1:03.16
|8 Q
|1:03.10
|9
|colspan=2|Did not advance
|-align=center
|align=left|200 m backstroke
|2:12.34
|2 Q
|colspan=2 
|2:13.09
|6
|-align=center
|align=left rowspan=3|Hannah McLean
|align=left|50 m backstroke
|29.36
|4 Q
|28.98
|4 Q
|28.89
|4
|-align=center
|align=left|100 m backstroke
|1:02.52
|4 Q
|1:02.46
|4 Q
|1:01.71
|4
|-align=center
|align=left|200 m backstroke
|2:14.37
|5 Q
|colspan=2 
|2:12.47
|
|-align=center
|align=left rowspan=3|Helen Norfolk
|align=left|100 m freestyle
|57.59
|15 Q
|57.10
|12
|colspan=2|Did not advance
|-align=center
|align=left|200 m individual medley
|2:16.93
|4 Q
|colspan=2 
|2:16.49
|5
|-align=center
|align=left|400 m individual medley
|4:51.46
|4 Q
|colspan=2 
|4:48.09
|5
|-align=center
|align=left rowspan=3|Georgina Toomey
|align=left|50 m freestyle
|27.46
|=18
|colspan=4|Did not advance
|-align=center
|align=left|50 m butterfly
|27.74
|13 Q
|27.71
|13
|colspan=2|Did not advance
|-align=center
|align=left|100 m butterfly
|1:03.13
|12 Q
|1:02.75
|13
|colspan=2|Did not advance
|-align=center
|align=left|Lauren BoyleAlison FitchHannah McLeanHelen Norfolk
|align=left|4 × 100 m freestyle relay
|colspan=4 
|3:43.49
|4
|-align=center
|align=left|Lauren BoyleAlison FitchMelissa IngramHelen Norfolk
|align=left|4 × 200 m freestyle relay
|colspan=4 
|8:02.20
|
|-align=center
|align=left|Annabelle CareyElizabeth CosterAlison FitchHannah McLean
|align=left|4 × 100 m medley relay
|colspan=4 
|4:06.30
|4
|}

Synchronised swimming
Lisa Daniels
Nina Daniels

Athletics
Michael Aish
Jane Arnott
Craig Barrett
Adrian Blincoe
Matthew Brown
Chantal Brunner
Sarah Cowley
Fiona Crombie
James Dolphin
Chris Donaldson
David Falealili
Stuart Farquhar
Beatrice Faumuina
Paul Hamblyn
Melina Hamilton
Liza Hunter-Galvin
Kate McIlroy
Angela McKee
Rebecca Moore
James Mortimer
Brent Newdick
Tony Sargisson
Jason Stewart
Carl van der Speck
Valerie Vili
Rebecca Wardell
Nick Willis

Badminton
Geoff Bellingham
Rebecca Bellingham
Craig Cooper
John Gordon
Nicole Gordon
Rachel Hindley
John Moody
Sara Petersen
Daniel Shirley
Lianne Shirley

Basketball

Men's team competition
Ed Book 	
Dillon Boucher 	
Pero Cameron 	
Casey Frank 	
Paul Henare 	
Mike Homik 	
Troy McLean 	
Aaron Olson 	
Tony Rampton 	
Lindsay Tait 	
Mika Vukona
Paora Winitana

Women's Team Competition
Micaela Cocks 	
Rebecca Cotton 	
Aneka Kerr	
Donna Loffhagen
Angela Marino
Jessica McCormack
Kate McMeeken-Ruscoe
Lisa Pardon
Charmian Purcell
Jody Tini
Lisa Wallbutton  	
Nonila Wharemate

Boxing
Kahukura Bentson
Joseph Blackbourn
Carl Commons
Jamie Garder
Soulan Pownceby
Gregory Weenink

Cycling

Mountain biking
Clinton Avery
Sonia Foote
Rosara Joseph
Kashi Leuchs
Mike Northcott
Robyn Wong

Road cycling
Tamara Boyd
Toni Bradshaw
Melissa Holt
Logan Hutchings
Michelle Hyland
Gordon McCauley
Glen Mitchell
Robin Reid
Hayden Roulston
Alison Shanks
Sarah Ulmer
Susie Wood
Lauren Byrne (Withdrew from choking incident)

Track cycling
Jason Allen
Richard Bowker
Fiona Carswell
Hayden Godfrey
Justin Grace
Timothy Gudsell
Greg Henderson
Joanne Kiesanowski
Peter Latham
Marc Ryan
Nathan Seddon
Catherine Sell
Adam Stewart
Paddy Walker
Elisabeth Williams

Hockey

Men's team
 Darren Smith
 Simon Child
 Blair Hopping
 Dean Couzins
 Ryan Archibald
 Bradley Shaw
 Bevan Hari
 Paul Woolford
 Kyle Pontifex
 Phil Burrows
 Hayden Shaw
 James Nation
 Bryce Collins
 Gareth Brooks
 Shea McAleese
 Ben CollierHead coach: Kevin Towns

Women's team
 Kayla Sharland
 Emily Naylor
 Krystal Forgesson
 Honor Dillon
 Lizzy Igasan
 Stacey Carr
 Suzie Muirhead
 Beth Jurgeleit
 Clarissa Eshuis
 Diana Weavers
 Jane Maley
 Frances Kreft
 Kate Mahon
 Anita Wawatai
 Charlotte Harrison
 Michelle HollandsHead coach: Ian Rutledge

Gymnastics

 Belinda Castles
 Teegan Metcalfe
 Olivia Jobsis
 Hayden Power

Lawn Bowls
Rowan Brassey
Gary Lawson
Russell Meyer
Richard Girvan
Justin Goodwin
Jamie Hill
Jo Edwards
Jan Khan
Marina Khan
Serena Mathews
Sharon Sims
Val SmithHead coach''': Peter Belliss

Netball
Belinda Colling
Vilimaina Davu
Leana de Bruin
Temepara George
Laura Langman
Anna Rowberry
Anna Scarlett
Jessica Tuki
Maria Tutaia
Irene Van Dyk
Casey Williams
Adine Wilson

Rugby Sevens
Sosene Anesi
Josh Blackie
Tamati Ellison
Nigel Hunt
Tafai Ioasa
Cory Jane
Tanerau Latimer
Liam Messam
Lote Raikabula
Amasio Valence
Alando Soakai
Onosai Tololima-Auva'a

Shooting
(incomplete) 
Teresa Borrell 
Graeme Ede 
Juliet Etherington 
Kathryn Mead
John Snowden  
Nadine Stanton 
Greg Yelavich

Squash
Louise Crome
Campbell Grayson
Shelley Kitchen
Martin Knight
Tamsyn Leevey
Callum O'Brien
Lara Petera
Glen Wilson

Table Tennis
Brad Chen
Andrew Hubbard
Jenny Hung
Peter Jackson
Shane Laugeson
Karen Li
Sophie Shu
Annie Yang

Triathlon
Hamish Carter
Bevan Docherty
Kris Gemmell
Andrea Hewitt
Debbie Tanner
Samantha Warriner

Weightlifting
Grant Cavit
Richard Patterson
Keisha-Dean Soffe
Mark Spooner

Note
* – athletes with known injuries at time of selection who are required to prove full fitness by 15 January 2006.

See also
New Zealand Olympic Committee
New Zealand at the 2004 Summer Olympics
New Zealand at the 2008 Summer Olympics

External links
Commonwealth Games New Zealand
Melbourne 2006
TVNZ Sport Commonwealth Games

2006
Nations at the 2006 Commonwealth Games
Commonwealth Games